{{Infobox Boxingmatch
|fight date    = June 9, 2012
|Fight Name    = Manny Pacquiao vs. Timothy Bradley
|image         =
|location      = MGM Grand Garden Arena, Paradise, Nevada, U.S.
|fighter1      = Manny Pacquiao
|nickname1     = Pac-Man
|record1       = 54-3-2 (38 KO)
|hometown1     = General Santos City, Philippines
|height1       = 5 ft 6+1/2 in
|style1       = Southpaw
|weight1       = 147 lbs
|recognition1  = WBO welterweight champion [[The Ring (magazine)|The Ring]] No. 2 ranked pound-for-pound fighter8-division world champion
|fighter2      = Timothy Bradley
|nickname2     = Desert Storm
|record2       = 28-0 (12 KO)
|hometown2     = Palm Springs, California, U.S.
|height2       = 5 ft 6 in
|weight2       = 146 lb.
|style2 = Orthodox
|recognition2  = WBO junior welterweight champion The Ring No. 8 ranked pound-for-pound fighter
|titles        = WBO welterweight title
|result        =  Bradley wins via 12-round split decision (113-115, 115-113, 115-113)
}}
Manny Pacquiao vs. Timothy Bradley, was a welterweight title boxing match held on June 9, 2012, at the MGM Grand Garden Arena in Paradise, Nevada. After 12 rounds, Bradley won a highly controversial split decision to take the WBO welterweight title.

 Background 

Pacquiao came into the fight following a controversial November 2011 majority decision victory in Manny Pacquiao vs. Juan Manuel Marquez III. He brought with him world championships in eight different weight classes—a feat unmatched by anyone.

After fight negotiations between Pacquiao and Floyd Mayweather Jr., ended without coming to terms, Mayweather opted to challenge junior middleweight titlist Miguel Cotto on May 5. Cotto had also been in the running to face Pacquiao in a rematch, but Pacquiao and Cotto could not agree on the weight for the fight. Pacquiao wanted the 147-pound welterweight limit, which Cotto said was too low for him, and he accepted a fight with Mayweather.  Also in the running to face Pacquiao were Lamont Peterson and Juan Manuel Marquez. Ultimately, it was Timothy Bradley who came to terms, agreeing to move up a weight class to challenge Pacquiao for his title.

Bradley came into the fight with a somewhat lower profile than a typical Pacquiao opponent. In January 2011, he won a 10th-round technical decision in a junior welterweight title unification bout against Devon Alexander.  Previously, he had beaten then world-champion Lamont Peterson to claim the title.  After the fight with Alexander, Bradley rejected an offer to fight Amir Khan and further unify the 140-pound division. He signed with Top Rank and was given a co-feature slot on the Pacquiao-Marquez III pay-per-view card in November. In his match, Bradley beat former lightweight champion Joel Casamayor in an eight-round fight.

Prior to the Pacquiao fight, Bradley was ranked as one of the top 10 pound for pound fighters in the world. In a show of confidence, Bradley had "rematch" posters printed up, implying he would win the fight.

Fight
Pacquiao entered the fight as a substantial favorite, among both bookmakers and fans. Bradley entered the fight as a 7-2 underdog in the Vegas line. The glove weight was set at 8 ounces each. Midway through the first round, the crowd spontaneously began to chant "Manny, Manny, Manny ..."

Throughout the fight, action was fast-paced, with Pacquiao landing the harder punches.  
He appeared to take control early, beating Bradley on most exchanges.  However, Bradley did make good use of the punches he was able to throw, connecting on some of them.  Pacquiao won the first round, according to two of the three judges. Bradley was the more aggressive fighter in the second, backing Pacquiao against the ropes at one point. However, Pacquiao's patience paid off as he countered effectively at the end of the round. Two of the judges awarded the round to Bradley. According to trainer Joel Diaz, Bradley hurt his ankle during the round, but chose to press on. Pacquaio took control in the third round, winning on all three judges' cards. By the end of the round, Bradley "looked stunned".

During the fourth and fifth rounds, Bradley seemed to be visibly hurting. In the fourth round, Bradley was cautioned for a low blow, and forced on defense throughout. During the final seconds of the round, Bradley appeared close to going down multiple times. Pacquiao remained on the offensive during the fifth, but Bradley managed to land some counterpunches. All three judges gave the fourth round to Pacquiao, but only one awarded him the fifth.

Pacquiao dominated the sixth round, trapping Bradley in the corner, and getting off several consecutive unanswered punches.  All judges gave Pacquiao the sixth round.

Things started to turn in Bradley's favor during the second half of the fight, as Pacquiao struggled to land big punches. Around the seventh round, Bradley began to use his double jab effectively, and avoid Pacquiao's counterpunches.  He moved better, and got off his own counterpunches.  "I got my second wind in the sixth round," Bradley said after the fight.  Bradley won the seventh round, according to all three judges, with Pacquiao being backed into the ropes near the end of the round.

The eighth round saw a brief stoppage after Bradley appeared to get caught in the eye by Pacquiao's thumb. After the stoppage, Bradley appeared to be in trouble, but reduced his arm swing, to avoid further counterattacks by Pacquiao.  Two judges scored the round in favor of Bradley. In the ninth round, Pacquiao was able to take advantage of Bradley's aggression, and drive him back into the ropes.  Bradley left himself too open to counterpunches, and Pacquiao won the round on two of the three judges' cards. Bradley bounced back in the tenth round, winning on all cards, thanks in part to a good head shot midway through the round.

During the eleventh round, Bradley appeared to be gaining momentum, landing a series of punches, and backing Pacquiao against the ropes. The crowd began to chant Bradley's name.  Pacquiao silenced the crowd with a series of punches of his own, but two judges gave the round to Bradley. In the final round, both fighters pushed the action. Bradley landed a strong shot to Pacquiao's jaw in the final minute, and the match ended with a series of wild punches by both parties.  Bradley won the final round on all three scorecards.

In the end, Bradley won a highly controversial split decision over Pacquiao. Judges Duane Ford and C. J. Ross scored the fight 115–113 in favor of Bradley, while Jerry Roth scored the fight 115–113 in favor of Pacquiao. It was Pacquiao's first defeat in seven years.  For his win, Bradley received a US$5 million check—the largest prize of his career.

Fight card
Welterweight Championship bout:  Manny Pacquiao (c) vs.  Timothy Bradley
Bradley won via split decision
Welterweight Championship bout:  Mike Jones vs.  Randall Bailey
Bailey won via 11th-round knockout
Bantamweight Championship bout:  Jorge Arce (c) vs.  Jesús Rojas
Fight ended in a no contest
Super Bantamweight Championship bout:  Guillermo Rigondeaux (c) vs.  Teon Kennedy
Rigondeaux won via 5th-round technical knockout

Main event official scorecard
Source:

 Preliminary card 

Welterweight bout:  Mikael Zewski vs.  Ryan Grimaldo
Zewski won via 3rd-round knockout
Welterweight bout:  Andrew Ruiz vs.  Tyler Larson
Ruiz won via unanimous decision
Super Middleweight bout:  Jesse Hart vs.  Manuel Eastman
Hart won via 1st-round technical knockout
Junior Lightweight bout:  Ernie Sanchez vs.  Wilton Hilario
Sanchez won via unanimous decision

Reaction
Following the announcement of the decision, the crowd booed loudly.  Pacquiao appeared to be stunned by the result. Fight promoter Bob Arum was irate, and said that he was worried about boxing's credibility in the aftermath of the decision. He also questioned the competence of the judges. Arum also stated that before the scorecards were read out, Bradley told him "I tried hard but I couldn't beat the guy." A few reporters questioned Bob Arum's sincerity in his comments and hinted that he was in on the bad decisions. One reporter, Tito Garcia of FanvsFan.com, interrupted Arum's press conference by loudly accusing Arum of fixing the fight. Garcia was physically ejected from the press conference.

Pacquiao said he was shocked by the result, but accepted the decision respectfully, saying "I did my best. I guess my best wasn't good enough," adding, "He never hurt me with his punches, most of them landed on my arms." Immediately after the fight, Bradley stated, "Every round was pretty close. I got to go home and view the tape and see if I really won." He later remarked, "I thought I won the fight. I didn't think he was as good as everyone says he was. I didn't feel his power."

The decision was criticized by many commentators. The Associated Press and the Los Angeles Times'' scored the fight 117–111 in favor of Pacquiao, while ESPN and Harold Lederman of HBO both scored the fight 119–109, also in Pacquiao's favor. ESPN boxing analyst and longtime trainer Teddy Atlas said that Pacquiao clearly won, and that it was a case of either incompetence or corruption. He added that boxing needs a national commission, so that judges can be accountable for their decisions. According to the AP's count, Pacquiao landed 253 punches to Bradley's 159. Former champion Oscar De La Hoya said that Bradley should have refused the title belt, and Pacquiao had won the fight.

However, not everyone was upset by the result. Corbin Middlemas of the Australian Broadcasting Corporation said the fight was very close and difficult to score. "For all of the sports vices, this [decision] wasn't one of them," he said. The only poor decision would have been to award either fighter victory by a large margin, he added.

Following the event, Bradley announced that he would welcome a rematch, which was also held at the MGM Grand Garden Arena on April 12, 2014. Pacquiao defeated Bradley via unanimous decision and regained the WBO title. Manny Pacquiao vs. Timothy Bradley III then took place almost two years later on April 9, 2016. Pacquiao again defeated Bradley via unanimous decision and knocked him down twice along the way.

Main event unofficial scorecards

Source:

Total, 57: Pacquiao 54 | Bradley 3.

WBO review
After the decision the WBO ordered a video review of the bout. The five judges on the WBO's committee all scored the fight in Pacquiao's favor — 118–110, 117–111, 117–111, 116–112 and 115–113. However, the WBO cannot overturn the result of the fight.

International broadcasting 

The fight drew 900,000 pay-per-view purchases.

References

External links
Manny Pacquiao vs. Timothy Bradley Official Fight Card from BoxRec

Bradley
2012 in boxing
Boxing in Las Vegas
2012 in sports in Nevada
Boxing on HBO
June 2012 sports events in the United States
MGM Grand Garden Arena